Gisela of Hungary (or Gisele, Gizella and of Bavaria;  985 – 7 May 1065) was the first queen consort of Hungary by marriage to Stephen I of Hungary, and the sister of Henry II, Holy Roman Emperor. She has been beatified by the Catholic Church.

Biography 
Gisela was a daughter of Henry II, Duke of Bavaria and Gisela of Burgundy. Gisela was raised very devout, most likely with bishop Wolfgang of Regensburg as her mentor and governor. She married King Stephen I of Hungary in 996 as a part of Hungary's policy of opening up to the West. The couple had a son, Saint Emeric, who died on 2 September 1031, while hunting boar. The wedding of Stephen and Gisela marked a turning point in Hungary's history.

Queen Gisela played a fundamental role in spreading the Christian faith and Western culture in Hungary.

When Edmund Ironside of England died, he was succeeded by Cnut. Edmund's infant sons were sent abroad and ended up under the protection of King Stephen of Hungary. One of the twins died young, but the other, Edward Atheling, was brought up as a protégé of Queen Gisela, and regarded in that foreign court as the heir to the Anglo-Saxon throne.

King Stephen died in 1038. In 1046 Gisela, her attendants, and a number of many Bavarian settlers left Hungary to return to Bavaria, where she joined Niedernburg convent in Passau and became the abbess.

She lived in the nunnery of Niedernburg in Passau, where she died.

Veneration 
Gisela's canonisation was attempted in the 18th century but failed. She was beatified in 1975. Her memorial days are 7 May and 1 February.

Gisela and her husband were not buried together. On 4 May 1996, the remains of King Stephen's right hand was preserved, and it was brought back together with a bone taken from the arm of Gisela. Both are now safely protected in glass and gold cases, and are displayed in the basilica in the western Hungarian town of Veszprém, where Gisela once lived.

Her grave is well known, and regarded as a holy place. The cross was commissioned by Queen Gisela for the tomb of her mother, who died in 1006 and was buried in the Niedermünster in Regensburg.

Blessed Gisela is depicted on a white limestone panel by Hungarian artist Sandor Kiss on the wall of the Chapel of Our Lady – Queen of Hungary in St. Peter's Basilica, Rome.

References

Sources 

 

|-

980s births
11th-century deaths
Hungarian queens consort
Hungarian people of German descent
German beatified people
Hungarian Roman Catholic saints
Roman Catholic royal saints
10th-century German women
11th-century German abbesses
10th-century Hungarian women
11th-century Hungarian women
Daughters of monarchs
Beatified people